HN or Hn may refer to:

Arts and entertainment 
 Hn., musical score notation for French horn
 A numbering system for Royal Doulton Figurines, e..g. HN211

Businesses and organizations 
Heavylift Cargo Airlines (IATA airline designator)
 Hutchinson and Northern Railway, Kansas, US, reporting mark

Media 
 HN, former alternate name for Headline News
 Hacker News

Places 
 Heilbronn, Germany, vehicle registration
 Herceg Novi, a town in Montenegro
 Honduras (ISO 3166-1 country code)
 .hn, the Internet country code top-level domain (ccTLD) for Honduras
 Hunan, a province of China
 Thesprotia, regional unit of Greece (vehicle plate code ⟨ΗΝ⟩, for capital Igoumenitsa )

Other uses 
 Hospitalman, a United States Navy Hospital corpsman rate
 , a two-letter combination used in some languages
 Reduction of /hn/ to /n/ in Old/Middle English
 Harmonic numbers

See also
 English horn, "E. hn." in music scores
 Saxhorn, "S. hn." in music scores